Ron Smith is an American bridge player.

Bridge accomplishments

Wins

 North American Bridge Championships (7)
 Senior Knockout Teams (1) 2015 
 Grand National Teams (1) 1996 
 Jacoby Open Swiss Teams (2) 1993, 1998 
 Blue Ribbon Pairs (1) 1979 
 Reisinger (1) 1987 
 Wernher Open Pairs (1) 2001

Runners-up

 Cavendish Invitational Pairs (2) 1985, 2001
 North American Bridge Championships (12)
 Grand National Teams (2) 1973, 2000 
 Blue Ribbon Pairs (1) 1988 
 Mitchell Board-a-Match Teams (1) 1994 
 Fast Open Pairs (1) 2002 
 Nail Life Master Open Pairs (1) 1998 
 Reisinger (2) 1978, 2008 
 Spingold (3) 1996, 2004, 2008 
 Vanderbilt (1) 1988

Notes

External links

American contract bridge players